Barom Reachea II (1579–1599), also known as Ponhea Ton, was the Cambodian king ruled from 1597 to 1599.

Ton was the second son of Satha I. In 1594, Cambodia was attacked by Siamese, he fled to Vientiane together with his father. He returned to Cambodia in 1597. With the help of Blas Ruiz and Diogo Veloso, he assumed power in May.

Ton was persuaded to accept for Spanish protectorate. Diogo Veloso and Blaz Ruiz were appointed the governor of Ba Phnum (Prey Veng Province) and of Treang (Takéo Province) respectively. However, in Phnom Penh, the European sailors soon came into conflict with Malay Muslims.

In 1599, Ton was killed by Cham Muslims at Pot Rat.

See also
Cambodian–Spanish War

References

16th-century Cambodian monarchs